The Heart Goes to Heaven, The Head Goes to Hell is the second full-length album recorded by alternative rock band That Handsome Devil.

Track listing

References

2011 albums
That Handsome Devil albums